Charuulata 2011 is a 2012 Bengali film directed by Agnidev Chatterjee. This film is based on Rabindranath Tagore's 1901 novella Nastanirh.

Plot 
Chaiti is a young beautiful woman and wife of newspaper editor Bikramjit. Bikramjit is a workaholic and always stay busy with his editorial works. In spite of being a highly educated woman, Chaiti has nothing to do and she spends her time with expensive saris, filing nails, watching TV.

Thus unhappy with her marriage and after an unfortunate miscarriage Chaiti befriends Amal to find a friendly company. Amal is good looking and adventurous. From Amal's point of view Chaiti is Charulata 2011

Cast 
 Rituparna Sengupta as Chaiti
 Kaushik Sen
 Dolon Roy
 Arjun Chakraborty as Bikramjit
 Dibyendu Mukherjee as Amal

See also 
 Life in Park Street, 2012 Bengali film

References

External links 
Times of India review

2012 films
Films based on works by Rabindranath Tagore
Bengali-language Indian films
2010s Bengali-language films
Films directed by Agnidev Chatterjee

Films scored by Indradeep Dasgupta